The 1996 African Cup of Nations was the 20th edition of the Africa Cup of Nations, the football championship of Africa (CAF). It was hosted by South Africa, who replaced original hosts Kenya. The field expanded for the first time to 16 teams, split into four groups of four; the top two teams in each group advancing to the quarterfinals. However, Nigeria withdrew from the tournament at the final moment under pressure from then-dictator Sani Abacha, reducing the field to 15. South Africa won its first championship, beating Tunisia in the final 2–0.

Qualified teams 

For full qualification see: 1996 African Cup of Nations qualification

 
 
 
 
 
 
 
 
 
 
  (holders)*
 
  (hosts)
 
 
 

* Nigeria withdrew prior to the start of the finals. Guinea, as the best side to not qualify, was offered Nigeria's spot in the finals, but declined due to a lack of preparation time.

Squads

Venues

First round 
Teams highlighted in green progress to the Quarter Finals.

Group A

Group B

Group C 

 withdrew, so their three matches were canceled.

Group D

Knockout stage

Quarterfinals

Semifinals

Third place match

Final

Scorers 
5 goals
  Kalusha Bwalya

4 goals
  John Moshoeu
  Mark Williams

3 goals

  Abedi Pele
  Ahmed El-Kass
  Imed Ben Younes
  Dennis Lota

2 goals

  Ali Meçabih
  Quinzinho
  François Omam-Biyik
  Brice Mackaya
  Tony Yeboah
  Zoubeir Baya
  Adel Sellimi
  Johnson Bwalya
  Kenneth Malitoli

1 goal

  Billel Dziri
  Tarek Lazizi
  Khaled Lounici
  Joni
  Paulão
  Aboubakari Ouédraogo
  Youssouf Traoré
  Boureima Zongo
  Georges Mouyémé
  Alphonse Tchami
  Joël Tiéhi
  Moussa Traoré
  Samir Ibrahim
  Ali Maher
  Aurelien Bekogo
  Guy Nzeng
  Felix Aboagye
  Charles Akonnor
  Kwame Ayew
  Mass Sarr Jr.
  Kelvin Sebwe
  Tico-Tico
  Mohamed Kallon
  John Gbassay Sessay
  Shaun Bartlett
  Mark Fish
  Phil Masinga
  Abdelkader Ben Hassen
  Hédi Berkhissa
  Kaies Ghodhbane
  Liombi Essende
  Roger Lukaku
  Elijah Litana
  Hillary Makasa
  Vincent Mutale

Own goal
  Helder Vicente (for Cameroon)

CAF Team of the Tournament 
Goalkeeper
  Chokri El Ouaer

Defenders
  Yasser Radwan
  Mark Fish
  Elijah Litana
  Isaac Asare

Midfielders
  Zoubeir Baya
  Hazem Emam
  Abedi Pele
  Mark Williams

Forwards
  Kalusha Bwalya
  Tony Yeboah

References

External links 

 Details at RSSSF
 Details at www.angelfire.com

 
African Cup of Nations, 1996
Africa Cup of Nations tournaments
Nations
African Cup of Nations
African Cup of Nations
African Cup of Nations